Tami Petri Antero Kiuru (born 13 September 1976) is a Finnish former ski jumper.

Career
Kiuru won a gold medal in the team large hill event at the 2003 FIS Nordic World Ski Championships. At the 2004 Ski Flying World Championships, he won bronze in the individual competition and silver in the team competition, as well as silver in the team competition at the 2006 event.

Kiuru had problems getting used to the new 'weight index' rule that was introduced for the 2003/04 season. At first, he gained weight to get permission to use longer skis, but later decided to slim back down in order to use shorter skis.

He also won a silver medal in the team large hill event at the FIS Nordic World Ski Championships 2005.

Kiuru proved that he is still in good condition by winning the Finnish Championship gold medal in the Individual Large Hill competition. He also won a silver medal in the team large hill event at the 2006 Winter Olympics in Turin.

World Cup

Standings

Wins

References

1976 births
Living people
Sportspeople from Vantaa
Finnish male ski jumpers
Olympic silver medalists for Finland
Olympic ski jumpers of Finland
Ski jumpers at the 2006 Winter Olympics
Olympic medalists in ski jumping
FIS Nordic World Ski Championships medalists in ski jumping
Medalists at the 2006 Winter Olympics